Culling animals in zoos is the process of segregating animals from a group according to desired or undesired characteristics; the process often ends with the segregated animals being killed.  Several reasons are given for culling in zoos, including a lack of space, the genes of the culled animals are over-represented in the zoo population, the (young) animal might be attacked or killed, or the culled animals have contracted a disease.

Because animals in zoos are killed for many reasons, such as old age or disease, just as pet animals are often euthanized because of health problems, it is beyond the scope of this list to identify every case where an animal is killed in a zoo. The list focuses on controversial, unusual or otherwise noteworthy cases where the incident was reported in national or international sources.

List

The following is a list of animals where their culling and euthanisation in zoos and wildlife (safari) parks has been covered by the general media.

Summary quotes
  "...five giraffes have been put down by zoos in Denmark since 2012."
  "Dr Lesley Dickie, executive director of EAZA, [said] that between 3,000 and 5,000 healthy animals are put down every year across Europe. 'That’s our estimate for all animals management euthanised in the zoo, be it tadpoles up until a giraffe'.  Among those killed were 22 healthy zebras, four hippos and two Arabian Oryx were also put down. The Oryx were killed at Edinburgh and London zoos in 2000 and 2001."

See also
 Animal euthanasia

References

External links
 EAZA statement on euthanasisa. 

Culled in zoos